Crataegus scabrida is a species of hawthorn.

References 

scabrida
Flora of North America